Mahmood Rahman (born 22 August 1982) is a Pakistani guitarist and former member of the Lahore-based rock band Overload.

Personal life 
His paternal grandfather is Justice S. A. Rahman (d. 1990), a judge associated with the Pakistan Movement and who served as Chief Justice of Pakistan in 1968, his father, Asad Rahman (d. 2012), a journalist and human rights activist, was also a guerrilla commander in Balochistan who has been named Chakar Khan by the local peoples for his contributions, while his mother, Tanvir Rahman, is an artist and film producer. 

Through his father, his uncle is Rashid Rehman, a journalist who has been the editor of Daily Times, who's the father of musician and leftist intellectual Taimur Rahman.

Rahman is married to actress-singer Meesha Shafi, daughter of actress Saba Hameed and sister of actor-singer Faris Shafi.

Career 

Rahman started his career as a guitarist with Atif Aslam in 2003, played guitar for his two No. 1 albums Jal Pari and Meri Kahani. He later parted ways amicably with Atif Aslam and went on to join Overload. His first and only album with Overload was Pichal Pairee. He has also composed and produced the lead single from the soundtrack of The Reluctant Fundamentalist, Dhol Bajay Ga. He hss also worked with Noori, and is currently playing with Meesha Shafi and Ali Azmat

He is also the President of the PAKMMA Fighting Alliance, Pakistan's biggest and most successful Mixed martial arts organisation in Pakistan. The Fighting Alliance is associated with ONE FC, Asia's largest MMA promotion with a viewership of over 350 million viewers across Asia. PAKMMA in Pakistan is responsible for nurturing upcoming talent, providing audiences with quality live entertainment, and eventually representing Pakistan on the big stage in ONE FC.

Discography

References

1982 births
Living people
Punjabi people
National College of Arts alumni
Pakistani male singers
Singers from Lahore